The 1996 NCAA Rifle Championships were contested at the 17th annual competition to determine the team and individual national champions of NCAA co-ed collegiate rifle shooting in the United States. The championship was hosted by the United States Air Force Academy at the Cadet Rifle Range in Colorado Springs, Colorado. 

Defending champions West Virginia again topped the team standings, finishing 11 points ahead of  Air Force. This was the Mountaineers' eleventh team title.

The individual champions were, for the smallbore rifle, Joe Johnson (Navy), and Trevor Gathman (West Virginia), for the air rifle.

Qualification
Since there is only one national collegiate championship for rifle shooting, all NCAA rifle programs (whether from Division I, Division II, or Division III) were eligible. A total of six teams ultimately contested this championship.

Results
Scoring:  The championship consisted of 120 shots by each competitor in smallbore and 40 shots per competitor in air rifle.

Team title

Individual events

References

NCAA Rifle Championships
1996 in shooting sports
NCAA Rifle Championships
NCAA Rifle Championship